Đuka Begović is a Croatian film directed by Branko Schmidt. It was released in 1991. This film is based on Ivan Kozarac's novel which tells the life of a fictional character named Đuka from childhood to his material and spiritual ruin.

References

External links

1991 films
1990s Croatian-language films
Films directed by Branko Schmidt
Zagreb Film films
Croatian drama films
Films based on Croatian novels
1991 drama films